Banes can refer to:

People
Joey Banes (born 1967), American football player
Lisa Banes (1955–2021), American actress
Matthew Banes (born 1979), English cricketer
Maverick Banes (born 1992), Australian tennis player

Places
Banes, Cuba, a municipality in Holguín Province, Cuba
Bath and North East Somerset (BANES), a local authority in England, United Kingdom

See also
 Baines, a surname